This is a list of state-owned enterprises of China. A state-owned enterprise is a legal entity that undertakes commercial activities on behalf of an owner government. Their legal status varies from being a part of government to stock companies with a state as a regular or dominant stockholder. There is no standard definition of a government-owned corporation (GOC) or state-owned enterprise (SOE), although the two terms are often used interchangeably. The defining characteristics are that they have a distinct legal shape and they are established to operate in commercial affairs. While they may also have public policy objectives, SOEs should be differentiated from other forms of government agencies or state entities that are established to pursue purely non-financial objectives. 

The role of the Chinese Communist Party (CCP) in SOEs has varied at different periods but has increased during the Xi Jinping administration, with the CCP formally taking a commanding role in all SOEs as of 2020. For example, Lai Xiaomin, the former president of state-owned China Huarong Asset Management announced in 2015 that during the operation of China Huarong Asset Management, the embedded CCP Committee will play a central role, and party members will play an exemplary role. As Jin et al wrote in 2022,

Significance 
According to academic Wendy Leutert, China's SOEs, "...contribute to central and local governments revenues through dividends and taxes, support urban employment, keep key input prices low, channel capital towards targeted industries and technologies, support sub-national redistribution to poorer interior and western provinces, and aid the state's response to natural disasters, financial crises and social instability."

As of 2017, China has more SOEs than any other country, and the most SOEs among large national companies. China's SOEs are leaders in its industry, equity markets, and overseas direct investment. State-owned enterprises accounted for over 60% of China's market capitalization in 2019 and generated 40% of China's GDP of US$15.97trillion (101.36 trillion yuan) in 2020, with domestic and foreign private businesses and investment accounting for the remaining 60%. As of the end of 2019, China's SOEs represented 4.5% of the global economy and the total assets of all China's SOEs, including those operating in the financial sector, reached US$78.08trillion. Ninety-one (91) of these SOEs belong to the 2020 Fortune Global 500 companies.

History of SOEs 
SOE mergers have been routine since 2000, and their pace has increased under Xi. The goals of China's current SOE mergers include an effort to create larger and more competitive national champions with a bigger global market share by reducing price competition among SOEs abroad and increasing vertical integration.

Overall, China's focus on SOEs during the Xi era have demonstrated a commitment to using SOEs to serve non-market objectives and increasing Party control of SOEs while taking some limited steps towards market liberalization, such as increasing mixed ownership of SOEs. Along with increased mergers, promotion of mixed ownership, and management of state capital have continued; results have been mixed.

State Council (Central Government)

China Investment Corporation
 Central Huijin Investment
 China Jianyin Investment
 China Everbright Group

SASAC of the State Council 

As of 2022, SASAC oversees 97 centrally owned companies. Companies directly supervised by SASAC are continuously reduced through mergers according to the state-owned enterprise restructuring plan with the number of SASAC companies down from over 150 in 2008.

Ministry of Finance

Ministry of Education
Peking University
Founder Group (70%)
 Peking University Resources Group (30% by Founder Group, 40% by Peking University directly)
 Peking University Resources (Holdings) (65.96% collectively by Founder Group and PKU Resources Group)
 Founder Technology
 Founder Holdings
 Jade Bird Software (48%)
 Beida Jade Bird Universal Sci-Tech (24.05% collectively)
 Sinobioway Group (40% as minority shareholder)

Regional Governments
Governments below the national level operate portfolios of SOEs which operate both domestically and abroad.

Anhui Province
 Anhui Conch Cement
 Masteel Group (49%)

Beijing Municipality 
 Beijing Guoxiang Asset Management
 UBS Securities (33%)
 Beijing State-owned Capital Operation and Management Center
 Shougang
 Shougang Company
 Shougang Concord International
 CSC Financial (37.46%)

Chongqing Municipality 
 Chongqing Iron and Steel Company

Gansu Province
 Gansu SASAC
 Baiyin Nonferrous (36.16%)

Guangdong Province
 Guangdong Rising Asset Management 
 Zhongjin Lingnan (36.04%)
 Rising Nonferrous Metals Share
 Guangdong Hengjian Investment Holding (100%)
 Shaoguan Iron and Steel Group (49%)
 Guangdong Provincial Communication Group
 Guangdong Provincial Railway Construction Investment Group
 Guangdong Holdings
 Guangdong Investment (54.68%)
TCL Corporation (36%)
Tonly Electronics Holdings Limited (48.70%)

Shenzhen City
 Shenzhen Capital Group

Zhuhai City
 Gree Group (100%)
 Gree Electric (sold in 2019)
 Gree Real Estate

Guangxi Zhuang Autonomous Region
 Guangxi Non-ferrous Metals

Guizhou Province
 Kweichow Moutai Group
 Kweichow Moutai

Hebei Province
 Hesteel Group
 Hesteel Company
 Hansteel
 Tangsteel

Heilongjiang Province
 Beiman Special Steel (41.37%)

Hubei Province

Wuhan City
 Wuhan Financial Holdings Group (100%)
 Founder BEA Trust (67.51%)

Liaoning Province
 Dongbei Special Steel
 Beiman Special Steel

Shanghai Municipality 
 Shanghai Data Exchange
 Shanghai Jiushi Group
 Shanghai Municipal Investment Group
 Shanghai International Port Group

Shandong Province
 Shandong Gaosu Group
 Shandong Energy Group

Linfen City
 Linfen Investment Group (100%)

Yantai City

 Yantai Guofeng (100%)
 Wanhua Industrial Group (39.497%)
 Wanhua Chemical Group (21.56%)

Shanxi Province
 Datong Coal Mining Group
 Datong Coal Industry
 Jincheng Anthracite Mining Group
 Shanxi Coking Coal Group
 Shanxi Coking Company
 Xishan Coal Electricity Group
 Xishan Coal and Electricity Power
 Taiyuan Coal Gasification Group (51%)

Tianjin Municipality 
 TEDA Holding
 Tianjin Pipe
 Tianjin TEDA F.C.
 Tianjin TEDA Co.

Xinjiang Uyghur Autonomous Region
 Xinjiang Investment Development Group (100%)
 Xinjiang Ba Yi Iron and Steel Group (15%)

Zhejiang Province

Ningbo City
 Bank of Ningbo (21.38%)

Hong Kong S.A.R.
 Hong Kong Link (100%)
 MTR Corporation (around 75% shares)
 Kowloon–Canton Railway Corporation (100%)

See also

 List of government-owned companies
 State ownership

References

 
Lists of companies of China
China
China